BBY may stand for:

 BBY Limited, an Australian stockbroking and corporate advisory firm
 Back Bay (MBTA station) (station code: BBY), Boston, USA
 Bambari Airport, Central African Republic (IATA code: BBY) 
 "Before Battle of Yavin", a system of measuring dates in Star Wars
 Best Buy (NYSE: BBY), American multinational retailer 
 Burnaby, British Columbia, Canada, a city
 Menchum language of Cameroon (ISO 639:bby)